Seven Brides for Seven Brothers is a 1954 American musical film, directed by Stanley Donen, with music by Gene de Paul, lyrics by Johnny Mercer, and choreography by Michael Kidd. The screenplay, by Albert Hackett, Frances Goodrich, and Dorothy Kingsley, is based on the short story "The Sobbin' Women", by Stephen Vincent Benét, which was based in turn on the ancient Roman legend of the Rape of the Sabine Women. Seven Brides for Seven Brothers, which is set in Oregon in 1850, is particularly known for Kidd's unusual choreography, which makes dance numbers out of such mundane frontier pursuits as chopping wood and raising a barn. Film critic Stephanie Zacharek has called the barn-raising sequence in Seven Brides "one of the most rousing dance numbers ever put on screen."  The film was photographed in Ansco Color in the CinemaScope format.

Seven Brides for Seven Brothers won the Academy Award for Best Scoring of a Musical Picture and was nominated for four additional awards, including Best Picture. In 2006, American Film Institute named Seven Brides for Seven Brothers as one of the best American musical films ever made. In 2004, Seven Brides for Seven Brothers was selected for preservation in the U.S. National Film Registry of the Library of Congress as being "culturally, historically, or aesthetically significant."

Plot
In 1850, backwoodsman Adam Pontipee arrives at an Oregon Territory town to look for a bride ("Bless Your Beautiful Hide"). He eventually meets Milly and proposes to her after seeing the quality of her cooking and her insistence on finishing her chores before she leaves with him. Despite not knowing him well, she accepts under the belief she is taking care of only him ("Wonderful, Wonderful Day").

When they arrive at his mountain cabin however, she is surprised to learn that he has six brothers – Benjamin, Caleb, Daniel, Ephraim, Frank, and Gideon – who all live uncouth lives with him. An angered Milly accuses Adam of manipulating her into becoming his servant, but he acknowledges that he needs her help due to how difficult living in the backwoods is and plans on sleeping outside to avoid losing face with his brothers, after Milly throws him out of the room. She eventually lets Adam sleep inside upon seeing him crawl up to sleep in a tree, explaining she had high hopes regarding marriage and love ("When You're in Love").

The next morning, Milly teaches the Pontipees cleanliness and proper manners. She is later shocked to learn Adam's brothers are unmarried as they rarely see girls and never learned how to communicate with them. Despite initial difficulties in changing their "mountain man" ways, they eventually realize they can only get brides by following Milly's example ("Goin' Co'tin'"). At a barn-raising social-gathering, the brothers meet Dorcas, Ruth, Martha, Liza, Sarah, and Alice, all of whom take a fancy to each other despite the women already having suitors, who taunt the Pontipees ("Hoedown/Barn Dance"). The brothers resist the urge to fight at Milly's request, but the suitors attack Adam, provoking Gideon to retaliate. A brawl ensues, in which the physically superior Pontipees overpower the suitors, but are expelled from town.

As winter comes and the brothers pine for the women they fell in love with ("Lonesome Polecat"), Milly asks Adam to help them. He reads his brothers "The Sobbin' Women" and Milly's Bible, telling them they should do whatever it takes to get their loves.

With Adam's aid, the brothers kidnap the six women before causing an avalanche in Echo Pass to stop the townspeople pursuing them. However, the Pontipees realize they forgot to kidnap a parson to conduct their weddings. Furious at the Pontipees' actions, Milly forces the men to live in the barn while the women stay in the house with her, sleeping in the brothers' beds. In response, a similarly furious Adam leaves for the Pontipees' trapping cabin further up the mountain to spend the winter alone. Gideon tells Milly, but she refuses to stop him.

Over the winter, the women vent their frustrations by pranking the remaining Pontipees and musing upon their slowly softening feelings towards marriage ("June Bride"). Spring arrives and the women and the Pontipees are paired off and happy in each other's company ("Spring, Spring") until Milly announces she is having Adam's baby, causing everyone present to come together to help her. She gives birth to a baby girl named Hannah in the spring and Gideon leaves to tell Adam. Adam still refuses to return, despite learning he has a daughter, so Gideon berates him for his selfishness and punches him before leaving, causing Adam to feel shame for his actions. After the snow in Echo Pass melts, Adam returns, as he had said he would. Upon meeting his daughter, he realizes how worried the townspeople must be over the missing women and tells his brothers they should return them; but having fallen in love the six couples are unwilling to part and the women run and hide rather than go back to town. After discovering this, Milly tells the brothers, who track them down only to encounter the angry townspeople, who have come through the pass intending to hang them for kidnapping the girls.

Alice's father, Reverend Elcott, hears Hannah crying as the townspeople sneak up onto the farm. Worried the baby might belong to one of the six women, he asks the women whose child Hannah is. After they all answer "mine", the fathers agree to give the six brothers and the six women a collective shotgun wedding.

Cast
The Brothers and their Brides:
 Howard Keel as Adam and Jane Powell as Milly
 Jeff Richards as Benjamin and Julie Newmar as Dorcas (credited as Julie Newmeyer)
 Matt Mattox as Caleb and Ruta Lee as Ruth (credited as Ruta Kilmonis)
 Marc Platt as Daniel and Norma Doggett as Martha
 Jacques d'Amboise as Ephraim and Virginia Gibson as Liza
 Tommy Rall as Frank and Betty Carr as Sarah
 Russ Tamblyn as Gideon and Nancy Kilgas as Alice

Brothers

To perform the dance numbers and action sequences, choreographer Michael Kidd wanted dancers to portray all six of Adam Pontipee's brothers. Kidd said that he "had to find a way to have these backwoods men dance without looking ridiculous. I had to base it all around activities you would accept from such people – it couldn't look like ballet. And it could only have been done by superbly trained dancers." However, he was able to integrate into the cast two non-dancer MGM contract players who were assigned to the film, Jeff Richards, who performed just the simpler dance numbers, and Russ Tamblyn, using him in the dance numbers by exploiting his talents as a gymnast and tumbler.

The other four brothers were portrayed by professional dancers – Matt Mattox, Marc Platt, Tommy Rall, and Jacques d'Amboise.  All four balanced on a beam together during their barn-raising dance.

The wood-chopping scene in Lonesome Polecat was filmed in a single take.

 Adam (light green shirt): Howard Keel, a professional singer, appeared as the eldest of the seven brothers. He also appeared as Petruchio in the film version of Kiss Me Kate, and appeared in leading roles, in other musical films including Rose Marie and Show Boat.
 Benjamin (orange shirt): Jeff Richards was a former professional baseball player who topped out at the AAA level of the minor leagues. Although obviously athletic, he is noticeably in the background, seated, or standing during the dance numbers so as to not expose his lesser dancing skills. This often relegated his partner, the classically trained ballet dancer Julie Newmar, to the background as well.
 Caleb (yellow shirt): Matt Mattox, a professional dancer, appeared on stage on Broadway and also danced in many Hollywood musical films. His singing voice for the film was dubbed by Bill Lee.
 Daniel (mauve shirt): Marc Platt, a professional dancer, danced the role of Chalmers / Dream Curly in the original 1943 Broadway production of Oklahoma!. He also had a dancing/speaking role in the 1955 film version of Oklahoma!, as Curly's friend who buys his saddle at the auction and complains about Ado Annie's pie.
 Ephraim (dark green shirt): Jacques d'Amboise, a principal dancer with New York City Ballet, was given special leave for the filming of Seven Brides for Seven Brothers (although he was recalled before filming was completed).  He also danced in other musical films, including the ballet role of the Starlight Carnival "barker" in the film Carousel (in which he partnered Susan Luckey in Louise's ballet). D'Amboise's work as a dance teacher for children was featured in the documentary film He Makes Me Feel Like Dancin', which won an Academy Award and Tony Award.
 Frank (red shirt): Tommy Rall, a professional dancer and singer, appeared on stage on Broadway and in many musical films. His roles included Bill Calhoun (Lucentio) in  the film version of Kiss Me Kate, and one of the Gallini brothers in the film Merry Andrew (in which he was one of the three featured acrobatic dancers in the circus engagement scene – Rall is the dancer in the center wearing the red shirt). He appeared in the film  Funny Girl, as the Prince who partnered Barbra Streisand in a parody of the ballet Swan Lake.
 Gideon (blue shirt): Russ Tamblyn was cast in the role of youngest brother Gideon. Tamblyn showcased his gymnastics training throughout the action sequences. He also had a starring role in the musical West Side Story as Riff. As of 2021, following d'Amboise's death, Tamblyn is the last surviving actor who played a brother.

Brides
Professional dancers played all seven of the brides.

The four girls whom Adam sees in the Bixby store when he first goes into town are Dorcas, Ruth, Liza and Sarah.

 Milly: Jane Powell channelled her experiences growing up in Oregon to create Milly. She and Howard Keel would later reprise their roles in a Seven Brides for Seven Brothers stage adaptation.  She also appeared in dancing and singing roles in many other musical films, including Royal Wedding, and Rich, Young and Pretty and also A Date with Judy. In the film, she marries Adam.
 Dorcas Gaylen: Julie Newmar (Newmeyer), wore a purple dress in the barn raising scene. Dorcas is one of the more confident girls, and has stated that she always wanted to be a June bride and have a baby right away. She is also the only girl shown to have a sibling, a younger sister. A classically trained ballerina, she would later rise to fame as Catwoman in the 1960s TV version of Batman. She also won a Supporting Actress Tony Award for The Marriage-Go-Round (starring Claudette Colbert). She appeared on her neighbor James Belushi's sitcom According to Jim after the two settled a highly publicized lawsuit. Her singing voice for the film was dubbed by Betty Allen. She marries Benjamin.
 Ruth Jepson: Ruta Lee (Kilmonis) enjoyed a long stage and television career, appearing in dozens of films and TV series, working with Lucille Ball, Sammy Davis Jr., Elizabeth Taylor, Natalie Wood, and Frank Sinatra. Lee appeared in the sitcom Roseanne as the first girlfriend of Roseanne's mother. Her singing parts for the film were dubbed in post-production by Betty Noyes. She is wearing a blue dress in the barn raising scene, and is shown to like baking pies. She marries Caleb.
 Martha: Norma Doggett performed in the 1940s-50s Broadway shows Bells Are Ringing, Fanny, Wish You Were Here, Miss Liberty, and Magdalena. Her singing voice for the film was dubbed by Bobbie Canvin. She wears a green dress during the barn raising scene. She marries Daniel.
 Liza: Virginia Gibson was nominated for a Tony Award in 1957 and performed regularly, as singer and dancer, on the Johnny Carson show. She wears a pink checkered dress during the barn raising scene. She marries Ephraim.
 Sarah Kine: Betty Carr was also a Broadway veteran, dancing in Damn Yankees, Happy Hunting, Mask and Gown, and Fanny (alongside Norma Doggett). Her singing voice for the film was dubbed by Norma Zimmer. She wears a yellow dress during the barn raising. She marries Frank.
 Alice Elcott: Nancy Kilgas made her film debut in Seven Brides for Seven Brothers. The youngest of the girls in the story, she is especially close with Milly and wears a peach colored dress in the barn raising scene. Her father is the town reverend. Gideon falls in love with her at first sight. She danced in the film versions of Oklahoma!, Shake, Rattle & Rock!, and Alfred Hitchcock's Torn Curtain. Her singing voice for the film was dubbed by Marie Greene. She marries Gideon.

Townspeople
 Reverend Elcott (Ian Wolfe) is the local preacher and father of Alice, one of the brides. He is the officiant in both wedding ceremonies in the movie. A longtime Hollywood character actor, he is perhaps best remembered for his roles as Carter, chief clerk to "Wilfred the Fox", Sir Wilfred Roberts in Witness for the Prosecution; Mr. Atoz in the Star Trek episode "All Our Yesterdays"; as Father Joseph the Abbot in The Frisco Kid; and as "Hirsch", "Mrs. Carlson's" butler on WKRP in Cincinnati.
 Pete Perkins (Howard Petrie) is a leading citizen of the town where the Pontipees do their trading. Another longtime Hollywood character actor, he is also known for his role as Tom Hendricks in Bend of the River and as Mr. Lattimore, the prosecuting attorney in the Randolph Scott movie Rage At Dawn.
 Mrs. Bixby (Marjorie Wood), co-owner of the general store in the town. Perhaps best known for playing Lady Lucas opposite Greer Garson and Laurence Olivier in Pride and Prejudice, she was a Hollywood veteran of 34 films going back to the silent movie era. She died a year after shooting wrapped on the movie.
 Mr. Bixby (Russell Simpson), co-owner of the general store in the town. A longtime Hollywood actor with 244 movie and television credits to his name going well back into the silents in 1914, his best known roles are as Pa Joad in The Grapes of Wrath, and Red Kelly in San Francisco.
 Harry (Earl Barton)
 Matt (Dante DiPaolo)
 Carl (Kelly Brown)
 Ruth's Uncle (Matt Moore)
 Dorcas' Father (Dick Rich)

Production
Choreographer Michael Kidd originally turned down the film, recalling in 1997: "Here are these slobs living off in the woods. They have no schooling, they are uncouth, there's manure on the floor, the cows come in and out – and they're gonna get up and dance? We'd be laughed out of the house."

Lyricist Johnny Mercer said that the musical numbers were written at Kidd's behest, as an example "of how a songwriter sometimes has to take his cue from his collaborators." For example, Kidd explained to Mercer and dePaul his conception of the "Lonesome Polecat" number, the lament of the brothers for the women, and the two worked out the music and lyrics.

In his introduction to a showing on Turner Classic Movies on January 17, 2009, host Robert Osborne, as well as Jane Powell in her autobiography, The Girl Next Door, both say MGM was much less interested in Seven Brides than it was in Brigadoon which was also filming at the time, even cutting its budget and transferring the money to the Lerner and Loewe vehicle.

Most of the movie was shot on the MGM sound stages. One exterior sequence not filmed at the studio was shot on location at Corral Creek Canyon in Sun Valley, Idaho. It was here that the escape following the brothers' kidnapping their future brides and the avalanche that closed the pass was filmed.

On the 2004 DVD commentary, Stanley Donen states that the film was originally shot in two versions, one in CinemaScope and another in normal ratio, because MGM was concerned that not all theaters had the capability to screen it.  Despite the fact that it cost more than the widescreen version to make, he says, the other version was never used. However, both versions are available on the 2004 DVD release.

The dresses worn by the female cast were made from old quilts that costume designer Walter Plunkett found at the Salvation Army.

Songs and music
The "Main Title" is a medley of the songs "Sobbin' Women", "Bless Your Beautiful Hide" and "Wonderful, Wonderful Day".

In the film, Matt Mattox's voice is dubbed in by Bill Lee on "Lonesome Polecat". Mattox can be heard singing the song on the soundtrack album.

Reception
Contemporary reviews from critics were positive. A. H. Weiler of The New York Times called the film "a wholly engaging, bouncy, tuneful and panchromatic package ... Although the powers at M-G-M are deviating from the normal song-and-dance extravaganza in 'Seven Brides for Seven Brothers,' it is a gamble that is paying rich rewards." Variety wrote: "This is a happy, hand-clapping, foot-stomping, country type of musical with all the slickness of a Broadway show. It offers songs, dances and romancing in such a delightful package that word-of-mouth could talk it into solid business at the boxoffice." Richard L. Coe of The Washington Post declared: "Dandy dancing, singable songs and the ozone of originality make 'Seven Brides for Seven Brothers' the niftiest musical I've seen in months." Harrison's Reports called it "A thoroughly delightful blend of songs, dances and romantic comedy" with "exceptionally good musical numbers." The Monthly Film Bulletin wrote that the dances "give the picture its remarkably spirited and exhilarating quality ... A minor weakness is the playing of Jane Powell, whose Milly is a somewhat colourless figure; Howard Keel, the brides and the brothers, however, are all admirable." John McCarten of The New Yorker posted a dissenting negative review, writing that the film "got on my nerves" and "struck me as desperately contrived and often witless", though he did concede that there were "some fine dances" in it.

Seven Brides for Seven Brothers was the 5th most popular film at the British box office in 1955. According to MGM records it made $5,526,000 in the US and Canada and $3,877,000 elsewhere resulting in a profit of $3,198,000.

The film came in third in a BBC Radio 2 listener poll of the UK's "Number One Essential Musicals" and was listed as number eight in the "Top 10 MGM musicals" in the book Top 10 of Film by Russell Ash. In 2004, the film was selected for preservation in the United States National Film Registry as being deemed "culturally, historically, or aesthetically significant." In 2006, it was ranked #21 on the American Film Institute's list of best musicals. In 2008, the film was ranked number 464 in Empires list of the 500 greatest films of all time.

Review aggregator Rotten Tomatoes awards Seven Brides for Seven Brothers an 88% "Fresh" rating based on 24 reviews, with an average rating of 7.7/10. The critics' consensus states: "Buoyed by crowd-pleasing tunes and charming performances, Seven Brides for Seven Brothers makes a successful transition from Broadway to screen that's sure to please the whole family", despite the fact that the movie was originally produced for film and debuted on Broadway over two decades later.

Awards and nominations

The film is recognized by American Film Institute in these lists:
 2006: AFI's Greatest Movie Musicals – #21

Publicity slogan
The following slogan was used to publicize the film in 1954:

 Adam abducted Milly
 Benjamin brought Dorcas
 Caleb caught Ruth
 Daniel detained Martha
 Ephraim eloped with Liza
 Frank fetched Sarah
 Gideon grabbed Alice

Adaptations and remakes
 The 1968–1970 TV series Here Come the Brides was inspired by the movie Seven Brides for Seven Brothers. 
 The 1978 stage musical Seven Brides for Seven Brothers is an adaptation of the film, with a book by Lawrence Kasha and David Landay. Four songs from the film ("Bless Your Beautiful Hide", "Wonderful Wonderful Day", "Goin' Courtin'", and "Sobbin' Women") were kept for the stage musical; the rest of the score consisted of new songs written by Al Kasha and Joel Hirschhorn.
 The TV series Seven Brides for Seven Brothers, loosely based on the film, ran weekly on CBS from September 19, 1982 to March 23, 1983.
 The 1982 Bollywood film Satte Pe Satta ("Seven On Seven") was a remake of Seven Brides for Seven Brothers.
 Loosely remade by the Brazilian comic group Os Trapalhões in 1988 as the film O Casamento dos Trapalhões ("The Bumbling ones' Wedding or Tramps' Wedding"). Instead of seven, are four brothers, (the members of Os Trapalhões) and midway through the movie, they are visited by their four nephews, all members of the Brazilian band Dominó.

References

External links

 
 
 
 
 
 Jacket Magazine: some background information

1954 films
1950s English-language films
1954 musical comedy films
1954 romantic comedy films
CinemaScope films
Films about weddings in the United States
Films about brothers
Films adapted into plays
Films adapted into television shows
Films based on short fiction
Films directed by Stanley Donen
Films scored by Saul Chaplin
Films scored by Adolph Deutsch
Films set in Oregon
Films set in the 1850s
American musical comedy films
Metro-Goldwyn-Mayer films
United States National Film Registry films
Films that won the Best Original Score Academy Award
1950s American films